Paul Mattick (born 25 April 1978, in Bath) is a British rower who competed at the 2008 Summer Olympics.

Rowing career
Mattick  competed in the men's lightweight coxless four at the 2008 Olympic Games and studied at Hertford College, Oxford. 

He was part of the British squad that topped the medal table at the 2011 World Rowing Championships in Bled, where he won a bronze medal as part of the lightweight coxless four with Richard Chambers, Chris Bartley and Rob Williams.

References

1978 births
Living people
English male rowers
British male rowers
Olympic rowers of Great Britain
Rowers at the 2008 Summer Olympics
Sportspeople from Bath, Somerset
Alumni of Hertford College, Oxford
World Rowing Championships medalists for Great Britain